Bolmen is a lake in Småland, Sweden. Covering 184 km², and with a maximum depth of 37 m, it supplies a considerable part of Skåne with fresh water by means of an 82-km long tunnel, the Bolmen Water Tunnel, built during the 1970s and 80s. Bolmen is situated at the heart of Finnveden, one of the small lands of today's Småland. It is the tenth largest lake in Sweden.

It contains 365 islands, of which the largest is Bolmsö, which was historically the meeting-place of the local assembly.

References

Småland
Lakes of Kronoberg County